Dance of the Rainbow Serpent is a 1995 three-CD retrospective box set by Santana that also covers Carlos Santana solo projects and appearances with other artists. Unless noted, all tracks are studio recordings, with some of them previously unreleased (all are on the third disc). The individual discs are sub-titled Heart, Soul, and Spirit. It includes a 60-page booklet with detailed track listing, song comments by Carlos Santana, musician credits, biographical essay and a poem by Hal Miller, a list of touring band members through the years, and a band/solo discography up to 1995. The cover art was done by Michael Rios and Anthony Machado.

Track listing

Disc 1 - Heart

Disc 2 - Soul

Disc 3 - Spirit

References

1995 compilation albums
Santana (band) compilation albums
Sony Records compilation albums